Robert John Aumann (Hebrew name: , Yisrael Aumann; born June 8, 1930) is an Israeli-American mathematician, and a member of the United States National Academy of Sciences. He is a professor at the Center for the Study of Rationality in the Hebrew University of Jerusalem in Israel. He also holds a visiting position at Stony Brook University, and is one of the founding members of the Stony Brook Center for Game Theory.

Aumann received the Nobel Memorial Prize in Economic Sciences in 2005 for his work on conflict and cooperation through game theory analysis. He shared the prize with Thomas Schelling.

Early years
Aumann was born in Frankfurt am Main, Germany, and fled to the United States with his family in 1938, two weeks before the Kristallnacht pogrom. He attended the Rabbi Jacob Joseph School, a yeshiva high school in New York City.

Academic career
Aumann graduated from the City College of New York in 1950 with a B.Sc. in mathematics. He received his M.Sc. in 1952, and his Ph.D. in Mathematics in 1955, both from the Massachusetts Institute of Technology. His doctoral dissertation, Asphericity of Alternating Linkages, concerned knot theory. His advisor was George Whitehead, Jr.

In 1956 he joined the Mathematics faculty of the Hebrew University of Jerusalem and has been a visiting professor at Stony Brook University since 1989. He has held visiting professorship at the University of California, Berkeley (1971, 1985–1986), Stanford University (1975–1976, 1980–1981), and Universite Catholique de Louvain (1972, 1978, 1984).

Mathematical and scientific contribution

Aumann's greatest contribution was in the realm of repeated games, which are situations in which players encounter the same situation over and over again.

Aumann was the first to define the concept of correlated equilibrium in game theory, which is a type of equilibrium in non-cooperative games that is more flexible than the classical Nash equilibrium. Furthermore, Aumann has introduced the first purely formal account of the notion of common knowledge in game theory. He collaborated with Lloyd Shapley on the Aumann–Shapley value. He is also known for Aumann's agreement theorem, in which he argues that under his given conditions, two Bayesian rationalists with common prior beliefs cannot agree to disagree.

Aumann and Maschler used game theory to analyze Talmudic dilemmas. They were able to solve the mystery about the "division problem", a long-standing dilemma of explaining the Talmudic rationale in dividing the heritage of a late husband to his three wives depending on the worth of the heritage compared to its original worth. The article in that matter was dedicated to a son of Aumann, Shlomo, who was killed during the 1982 Lebanon War, while serving as a tank gunner in the Israel Defense Forces's armored corps.

Aumann's Ph.D. students include:
Bezalel Peleg, David Schmeidler, Shmuel Zamir, Elon Kohlberg, Zvi Artstein, Benyamin Shitovitz, Eugene Wesley,
Sergiu Hart, Abraham Neyman, Yair Tauman, Dov Samet, Ehud Lehrer, Yossi Feinberg, Itai Arieli, Uri Weiss and Yosef Zohar.

Torah codes controversy
Aumann has entered the controversy of Bible codes research. In his position as both a religious Jew and a man of science, the codes research holds special interest to him. He has partially vouched for the validity of the "Great Rabbis Experiment" by Doron Witztum, Eliyahu Rips, and Yoav Rosenberg, which was published in Statistical Science. Aumann not only arranged for Rips to give a lecture on Torah codes in the Israel Academy of Sciences and Humanities, but sponsored the Witztum-Rips-Rosenberg paper for publication in the Proceedings of the National Academy of Sciences. The academy requires a member to sponsor any publication in its Proceedings; the paper was turned down however.

In 1996, a committee consisting of Robert J. Aumann, Dror Bar-Natan, Hillel Furstenberg, Isaak Lapides, and Rips, was formed to examine the results that had been reported by H.J. Gans regarding the existence of "encoded" text in the bible foretelling events that took place many years after the Bible was written. The committee performed two additional tests in the spirit of the Gans experiments. Both tests failed to confirm the existence of the putative code.

After a long analysis of the experiment and the dynamics of the controversy, stating for example that "almost everybody included [in the controversy] made up their mind early in the game" Aumann concluded: "A priori, the thesis of the Codes research seems wildly improbable... Research conducted under my own supervision failed to confirm the existence of the codes – though it also did not establish their non-existence. So I must return to my a priori estimate, that the Codes phenomenon is improbable".

Political views
These are some of the themes of Aumann's Nobel lecture, named "War and Peace":
 War is not irrational, but must be scientifically studied in order to be understood, and eventually conquered;
 Repeated game study de-emphasizes the "now" for the sake of the "later";
 Simplistic peacemaking can cause war, while an arms race, credible war threats and mutually assured destruction can reliably prevent war.

Aumann is a member of Professors for a Strong Israel (PSI), a right-wing political group. Aumann opposed the disengagement from Gaza in 2005 claiming that it was a crime against Gush Katif settlers and a serious threat to the security of Israel. By presenting an unyielding demand, he claims that the Arab states will force Israel to "yield to blackmail due to the perception that it will leave the negotiating room with nothing if it is inflexible".

As a result of his political views, and his use of his research to justify them, the decision to give him the Nobel prize was criticized in the European press. A petition to cancel his prize garnered signatures from 1,000 academics worldwide.

In a speech to the religious Zionist youth movement, Bnei Akiva, Aumann claimed that Israel is in "deep trouble" due to his belief that anti-Zionist Satmar Jews might have been right in their condemnation of the original Zionist movement. "I fear the Satmars were right", he said, and quoted a verse from Psalm 127: "Unless the Lord builds a house, its builders toil on it in vain." Aumann feels that the historical Zionist establishment failed to transmit its message to its successors, because it was secular. The only way that Zionism can survive, according to Aumann, is if it has a religious basis.

In 2008, Aumann joined the Ahi political party, which was led at the time by Effi Eitam and Yitzhak Levy.

Personal life 
Aumann married Esther Schlesinger in April 1955 in Brooklyn. They had met in 1953, when Esther, who was from Israel, was visiting the United States. The couple had five children; the oldest, Shlomo, a student in Yeshivat Shaalvim, was killed in action while serving as a tank gunner in the Israel Defense Forces's armored corps in the 1982 Lebanon War. , an institute affiliated with Shaalvim that republishes old manuscripts of Jewish legal texts, was named after him. Esther died of ovarian cancer in October 1998. In late November 2005, Aumann married Esther's widowed sister, Batya Cohn.

Aumann is a distant relative of the late Oliver Sacks.

Honours and awards 
 1974: Foreign Honorary Member of the American Academy of Arts and Sciences
 1983: Harvey Prize in Science and Technology.
 1994: Israel Prize for economics.
 1998: Erwin Plein Nemmers Prize in Economics from Northwestern University.
 2002: The EMET Prize in the Social Sciences category, for Economics
 2005: Nobel Memorial Prize in Economic Sciences (share US$1.3 million prize with Thomas Schelling).
 2006: Yakir Yerushalayim (Worthy Citizen of Jerusalem) award from the city of Jerusalem.

Publications 
 1956: Asphericity of alternating knots, Annals of Mathematics 64: 374–92 
 1958: (with J. B. Kruskal) The Coefficients in an Allocation Problem, Naval Research Logistics
 1960: Acceptable Points in Games of Perfect Information, Pacific Journal of Mathematics 10 (1960), pp. 381-417
 1974: (with L.S. Shapley) Values of Non-Atomic Games, Princeton University Press
 1981: (with Y. Tauman and S. Zamir) Game Theory, volumes 1 & 2 (in Hebrew), Everyman's University, Tel Aviv 
 1989: Lectures on Game Theory, Underground Classics in Economics, Westview Press
 1992,94,2002: (coedited with Sergiu Hart) Handbook of Game Theory with Economic Applications, volumes 1,2 & 3 Elsevier 
 1995: (with M. Maschler) Repeated Games with Incomplete Information, MIT Press
 2000: Collected Papers, volumes 1 & 2, MIT Press.
 2015: (with I. Arieli) The Logic of Backward Induction, Journal of Economic Theory 159 (2015), pp. 443-464

See also 
 List of Israel Prize recipients
 List of Israeli Nobel laureates
 List of Jewish Nobel laureates
 List of economists

References

External links 

 Official homepage
 

Nobel laureates in Economics
Israeli Nobel laureates
American Nobel laureates
Economists from New York (state)
20th-century American economists
Israeli economists
Jewish American economists
Jewish economists
Israeli mathematicians
Jewish American scientists
Israeli scientists
Jewish scientists
Jewish emigrants from Nazi Germany to the United States
American emigrants to Israel
City College of New York alumni
Fellows of the American Academy of Arts and Sciences
Fellows of the Econometric Society
Game theorists
American people of German-Jewish descent
Academic staff of the Hebrew University of Jerusalem
Israel Prize in economics recipients
EMET Prize recipients in the Social Sciences
Israeli people of German-Jewish descent
Israeli Orthodox Jews
American Orthodox Jews
John von Neumann Theory Prize winners
Massachusetts Institute of Technology School of Science alumni
Members of the Israel Academy of Sciences and Humanities
Members of the United States National Academy of Sciences
Rabbi Jacob Joseph School alumni
Stony Brook University faculty
RAND Corporation people
Living people
1930 births
Nancy L. Schwartz Memorial Lecture speakers